Austin Kyle Nola (born December 28, 1989) is an American professional baseball catcher for the San Diego Padres of Major League Baseball (MLB). He previously played in MLB for the Seattle Mariners.

Nola was born and raised in Baton Rouge, Louisiana, where he and his brother Aaron attended Catholic High School. The Colorado Rockies drafted Nola out of high school in 2008, but he declined their offer, instead committing to play college baseball for Louisiana State University, where he helped the Tigers win the 2009 College World Series championship. He was drafted after his junior year in 2011, this time by the Toronto Blue Jays, but chose to finish his college career.

The Miami Marlins then selected Nola in the fifth round of the 2012 MLB Draft, and he elected to sign with them for a $75,000 signing bonus. He spent the next few seasons rising through the Marlins' farm system, reaching the Triple A New Orleans Zephyrs in 2015. There, his career stalled, and Nola, worried that he would not make it to the major leagues, made the change from shortstop to catcher. He learned the position while playing in the Arizona Fall League, then began starting behind the plate full-time in 2017. A free agent after the 2018 season, Nola signed a contract with the Mariners. He made his major league debut with Seattle in June 2019. At the 2020 trading deadline, the Mariners traded Nola to the Padres, with whom Nola had his first MLB postseason appearance. He caught the Padres through the 2020 National League Wild Card Series, taking the team to the 2020 National League Division Series.

Early life 
Nola was born on December 28, 1989, in Baton Rouge, Louisiana. He is the oldest son of A. J. Nola, a remodeling and construction company owner and baseball coach, and Stacie Nola, a part-time secretary. His younger brother Aaron went on to pitch for the Philadelphia Phillies of Major League Baseball (MLB). Their maternal grandfather, Richard Barrios, once served as the sergeant at arms for the Louisiana House of Representatives. Nola took to baseball from an early age, often playing catch with his father in their backyard after school. A. J. also served as Austin and Aaron's baseball coach throughout their childhood.

While attending Catholic High School in Baton Rouge, Nola played shortstop for the school baseball team. He made the varsity team as a freshman and led the team in hitting that year. As a junior in 2007, Nola was part of Catholic's district championship team. During all four years of his high school baseball career, Nola was an all-state shortstop selection. As a senior in 2008, Nola was named the Baton Rouge Advocate's Star of Stars in Baseball. He batted .447 that year with 48 runs scored, 42 runs batted in (RBIs), and 13 home runs.

College career
The Colorado Rockies selected Nola in the 48th round of the 2008 MLB Draft, but he chose not to sign with the team, instead committing to play college baseball for Louisiana State University (LSU). Seeking to improve an infield defense that had gone 40 games without a successful double play in 2009, LSU moved junior DJ LeMahieu to second base and made freshman Nola their starting shortstop. Nola played well at the position and batted .240 with 27 runs, 18 RBIs, and three home runs during the regular season. In the 2009 College World Series, Nola batted .250 with four runs and one home run.  He boasted a perfect 1.000 fielding percentage, making no errors in 24 chances as LSU won its sixth championship.

Returning to LSU as a sophomore in 2010, Nola started all 63 regular-season games at shortstop, batting .320 with 50 runs, 52 RBIs, and five home runs. That year, LSU beat Alabama for their third straight Southeastern Conference (SEC) championship title, and Nola was named the tournament Most Valuable Player (MVP). Later that year, Nola played collegiate summer baseball for the Harwich Mariners of the Cape Cod Baseball League. He returned to LSU as a junior in 2011, starting as the shortstop in all 56 games. On April 10, while playing against Arkansas, Nola hit a grand slam in the sixth inning of an eventual 5–4 defeat. In addition to being the first grand slam of Nola's career, it was the only one by an LSU player during the 2011 season.

Nola played for Harwich again during the 2011 season, batting .217 in 39 games with 15 RBIs and 17 runs scored. Both Nola and his younger brother were selected by the Toronto Blue Jays in the 2011 MLB Draft, but both brothers chose LSU over signing with the team. Austin returned to finish his senior year, while Aaron was starting as a freshman. He collected his second career grand slam on April 13, 2012, in a 10–2 victory over Alabama. LSU made it through several regional rounds of the 2012 NCAA Division I baseball tournament but fell to the Stony Brook Seawolves in their Cinderella run to the College World Series. At the end of his college career, Nola was awarded the Wally Pontiff Academic Achievement Award as the top scholar-athlete on LSU's baseball team. He batted .299 during his senior season, with four home runs and 43 RBIs in 64 games.

Professional career

Miami Marlins organization
The Miami Marlins selected Nola in the fifth round, 167th overall, of the 2012 MLB Draft. He signed with the team shortly thereafter, for a $75,000 signing bonus. He was initially assigned to the Class A Short Season Jamestown Jammers of the New York–Penn League, but, after only a few weeks there, Nola was promoted to the Class A Greensboro Grasshoppers of the South Atlantic League. Nola played in 65 games during his rookie season, batting .211 with 48 hits, one home run, and 18 RBIs. In 2013, Nola played with the Jupiter Hammerheads of the Class A-Advanced Florida State League. In 489 at bats, he batted .232 with one home run, 40 RBIs, and 96 hits.

In 2014, Nola was assigned to the Double A Jacksonville Suns of the Southern League. In 134 games as Jacksonville's shortstop, Nola hit .259 with one home run and 53 RBIs. In the postseason, Nola helped take Jacksonville to their sixth Southern League championship, scoring two runs and driving in another in a 6–1 victory over the Chattanooga Lookouts to sweep the final series in three games. After the conclusion of the 2014 minor league season, Nola was assigned to the Salt River Rafters of the Arizona Fall League, alongside five other Marlins prospects. He played in 13 games for Salt River, batting .298 with six RBIs and nine runs. Although Nola had hoped to begin the 2015 season with the Triple A New Orleans Zephyrs, the crowded Zephyrs infield meant that he returned to Jacksonville at the start of the year. He was called up to the Zephyrs on June 28, after infielder Miguel Rojas and outfielder Cole Gillespie received major league promotions. Because the Zephyrs wore the abbreviation "NOLA" on the front of their jerseys, short for "New Orleans, Louisiana", Nola's name appeared on both the front and back of his Zephyrs uniform. He played 61 games at Triple A in 2015, batting .280 with 18 RBIs and 18 runs scored.

Nola returned to the Zephyrs in 2016, serving as the starting shortstop and the second batter in the batting order. He also spent time at third base, and practiced at second base to diversify his infield repertoire. Nola batted .261 that season, with six home runs and 44 RBIs in 372 at bats. During the 2016 season, Nola worried that his career was stalling and that he was not on the way to the major leagues. The Zephyrs' hitting coach, Paul Phillips, suggested that Nola transition from shortstop to catcher, and he rejoined the Arizona Fall League in order to learn the new position. In eight games with the Mesa Solar Sox, Nola batted .273, with two home runs and five runs scored. That November, the Marlins added Nola to their expanded roster in order to protect him from the Rule 5 draft.

During the 2016–17 offseason, Nola received private instruction from his brother on how to better his catching abilities through communication with pitchers. His ability to control the game from behind the plate impressed coaches during spring training, and Nola began the season on the Marlins' 40-man roster for the first time in his career. Nola spent the entire 2017 season behind the plate. He started with the Double A Jacksonville Jumbo Shrimp, playing 54 games with them before receiving a promotion to which had changed its name from the Zephyrs to the Baby Cakes. Between the two teams, Nola batted .233 in 2017, with three home runs and 31 RBIs. Although Nola began the 2018 season on the Marlins' roster, he was designated for assignment on March 29, and was placed on waivers in order to join the Baby Cakes. There, he served as the team's starting catcher and bottom-of-the-order batter. He played 69 minor league games that season, batting .279 with two home runs and 32 RBIs. Nola became a free agent at the end of the season.

Seattle Mariners
Nola signed a minor league contract with the Seattle Mariners on November 9, 2018. He opened the season with the Triple-A Tacoma Rainiers of the Pacific Coast League, who used him as a utility player. In his first 25 games, Nola played 15 at catcher, eight at first base, and two at third base. He was called up to the Mariners on June 16, 2019, and made his major league debut the same day. He started the 6–3 victory over the Oakland Athletics at first base, a position that had been left vacant after the Mariners traded Edwin Encarnacion to the New York Yankees, and recorded his first hit in the third inning of the game. His first major league home run came later that month, a solo shot against Wade Miley of the Houston Astros on June 28. The Astros went on to win the game 2–1 in extra innings. Nola finished the season with a .269 batting average, including 10 home runs and 31 RBIs, in 267 at bats for the Seattle Mariners. He played a variety of positions for the team, spending most of his time at first base, with appearances at second and third base, catcher, and left and right field.

After Tom Murphy broke one of the metatarsal bones in his left foot prior to opening day, Nola was chosen as the Mariners' starting catcher for the 2020 season, which began on July 24, 2020, due to the COVID-19 pandemic. Joe Hudson was named as Nola's backup. In the first month of the season, Nola was a consistently strong hitter for the Mariners, with five home runs, 17 RBIs, and nine multi-hit games in his first 25 appearances. He also grew more comfortable behind the plate, telling reporters, "I like getting back there. I learn so much from being back there a lot." In 29 games with the Mariners in 2020, Nola batted .306 with five home runs and 19 RBIs.

San Diego Padres

On August 30, 2020, the Mariners traded Nola, as well as pitchers Dan Altavilla and Austin Adams, to the San Diego Padres, in exchange for infielder Ty France, outfielder Taylor Trammell, pitcher Andrés Muñoz, and catcher Luis Torrens. The trade was part of a larger series of deadline moves by Padres general manager A. J. Preller, who aimed to take the team to its first playoff appearance in 14 seasons. That postseason, the Padres appeared in the 2020 National League Wild Card Series, facing the St. Louis Cardinals. In the final match of the three-game series, the Padres played a bullpen game, and Nola became the first MLB catcher to backstop nine pitchers through a postseason shutout, taking the team to the 2020 National League Division Series (NLDS). There, the Los Angeles Dodgers swept the Padres in a three-game series. After the season ended, Nola revealed that he had fractured his foot on a foul ball about a week after the trade was finalized, but he had continued playing through the injury. In the 48 games which he caught, pitchers posted a 2.50 earned run average (ERA), the lowest among all team catchers. Offensively, Nola batted .273 in 161 at bats with the Padres that year, including seven home runs, 28 RBIs, and 24 runs scored.

During spring training in 2021, Nola fractured the middle finger of his left hand while attempting to catch a foul tip. He missed the first month of the season, with backup catchers Victor Caratini and Luis Campusano filling in behind the plate until Nola was reactivated on April 27. After playing only 18 games upon his return, Nola was sidelined again, this time with a sprained knee. Webster Rivas was called up from Triple-A in Nola's place. Nola began practicing again at the start of July, and started behind the plate again on July 28 for a game against the Oakland Athletics. Nola faced his brother for the first time in their respective MLB careers on August 21, when the Padres played the Phillies. Austin struck out swinging on three consecutive fastball pitches from Aaron. Nola's injury-ridden season came to an end on September 24, when he was shut down to undergo thumb surgery from an injury sustained in a home plate collision with Brandon Belt of the San Francisco Giants. Prior to 2021, Nola had never gone on the injured list in either the minor or the major leagues; that season, his finger, knee, and thumb injuries limited Nola to only 56 games. He batted .272 in the games he did play, with two home runs and 29 RBIs in 173 at bats.

During Game 2 of the 2022 National League Championship Series, Austin and Aaron Nola became the first pair of brothers in Major League Baseball postseason history to face each other as pitcher and batter.

On January 13, 2023, Nola agreed to a one-year, $2.35 million contract with the Padres, avoiding salary arbitration.

Personal life
Nola and his wife Michelle have one son together who was born on March 26, 2020, which would have been opening day had the 2020 MLB season not been postponed due to the COVID-19 pandemic. Their daughter was born on September 9, 2022.

Nola is of Italian descent; his great-grandparents emigrated to Baton Rouge from Sicily. His brother Aaron Nola currently pitches for the Philadelphia Phillies. Their uncle suffers from amyotrophic lateral sclerosis (ALS), and in January 2020, the Nola brothers hosted a "Strike Out ALS" charity event on his behalf.

Notes

References

External links

1989 births
Living people
Baseball players from Baton Rouge, Louisiana
Catholic High School (Baton Rouge, Louisiana) alumni
Major League Baseball infielders
Seattle Mariners players
San Diego Padres players
LSU Tigers baseball players
Harwich Mariners players
Jamestown Jammers players
Greensboro Grasshoppers players
Jupiter Hammerheads players
Jacksonville Suns players
New Orleans Zephyrs players
Salt River Rafters players
Mesa Solar Sox players
Jacksonville Jumbo Shrimp players
New Orleans Baby Cakes players
Tacoma Rainiers players
Estrellas Orientales players
American expatriate baseball players in the Dominican Republic
American people of Italian descent